Kleinhans Music Hall is a concert venue located on Symphony Circle in Buffalo, New York. The hall "is renowned for its acoustical excellence and graceful architecture." Kleinhans is currently the home of the Buffalo Philharmonic Orchestra, a regular venue for the Buffalo Chamber Music Society, and is rented out for other performing groups and local events. The building was designed by father-and-son team Eliel Saarinen and Eero Saarinen, with help from local architects F. J. and W. A. Kidd, Stanley McCandless as lighting consultant, and Charles C. Potwin as acoustical adviser. Kleinhans has two performance spaces, as well as additional rooms for rehearsals or private events. It was declared a National Historic Landmark in 1989 for its architecture, 49 years after its completion.

Performance spaces 
Kleinhans Music Hall offers two spaces for performances, the main auditorium and the Mary Seaton Room. The main auditorium seats 2,441 (it originally accommodated 2839 seats but underwent renovations in 2015 reducing the capacity), and showcases the hall's parabolic ceiling and acoustically-informed design. The shape of the hall is such that audience members in the back rows of the balcony will have as clear and instantaneous of an auditory experience as the people in the front rows of the ground level. Charles C. Potwin employed a 1:1.3 ratio in the design of the auditorium to achieve the most ideal acoustic. While the design of the main auditorium is less conducive to reverberation, it aims to create a more intimate experience by drawing the audience in. The austere color palette and simple lines seen in the layout also serve to direct the audience to the music without distraction of ornate decoration.

The Mary Seaton Room is the smaller of the two performance venues, seating up to 700 for a concert, and is well suited for chamber ensembles.

History
Kleinhans Music Hall was named by Edward L. Kleinhans in honor of his wife, Mary Seaton Kleinhans, and his mother, Mary Livingston Kleinhans. The Kleinhans family owned a successful men's clothing company in Buffalo at the turn of the 20th century. Upon their deaths, three months apart in 1934, they left their entire estate of around $1 million to the Community Foundation for Greater Buffalo with the request that the funds go to the development of a music hall.

Upon its completion in 1940, the cost of construction reached $1.5 million, and included funds from President Roosevelt's Public Works Administration in addition to the $1 million from the Kleinhans estate. Kleinhans Music Hall opened on October 19, 1940 with an inaugural concert by the Buffalo Philharmonic Orchestra under Maestro Franco Autori.

In 2015, the seats of the auditorium were updated, and storage rooms were converted into an archive room to serve as an educational feature of the building's philanthropic history and architectural significance.

Notable events
On September 8, 1964, Robert F. Kennedy, who at the time was the Democratic candidate to become a United States Senator from New York, gave a speech at Kleinhans in front of a crowd of 6,000 people.

On November 9, 1967, four months after the city was rocked by the Buffalo riot, Dr. Martin Luther King Jr. gave a speech at Kleinhans titled "The Future of Integration." In this speech, he proclaimed, "We are moving toward the day when we will judge a man by his character and ability instead of by the color of his skin."

References

External links

 Kleinhans Music Hall - Venue Website
Information from the Buffalo Philharmonic Orchestra
 Dr. Martin Luther King, Jr. at Buffalo

Music venues completed in 1940
Buildings and structures in Buffalo, New York
Concert halls in New York (state)
Music of Buffalo, New York
Economy of Buffalo, New York
Eero Saarinen structures
National Historic Landmarks in New York (state)
Tourist attractions in Buffalo, New York
Modernist architecture in New York (state)
National Register of Historic Places in Buffalo, New York
Event venues on the National Register of Historic Places in New York (state)
1940 establishments in New York (state)